Nikola Jokić ((); born February 19, 1995) is a Serbian professional basketball player who is a center for the Denver Nuggets of the National Basketball Association (NBA). A five-time NBA All-Star, he has been named to the All-NBA Team on four occasions (including three first-team selections), and won the NBA Most Valuable Player Award for the 2020–21 and 2021–22 seasons. He represents the Serbian national team.

Nicknamed "the Joker", Jokić was selected by the Nuggets in the second round of the 2014 NBA draft. He was voted to the NBA All-Rookie First Team in 2016. In the 2018–19 NBA season, while leading the Nuggets to the Western Conference Semifinals, he received his first All-Star and All-NBA First Team selections. In the following season, he once again received All-Star and All-NBA honors, while leading his team to the Western Conference Finals. Jokić ranks among the top 10 on the all-time list of the NBA players with the most triple-doubles (regular season and playoffs), where he is the leading European player and center, and he holds the record for fastest triple-double (achieved in 14 minutes and 33 seconds). He also won a silver medal at the 2016 Summer Olympics.

Early life
Jokić was born in the city of Sombor in the northern part of Serbia. He grew up in a cramped two-bedroom apartment that housed him and his two brothers, both parents and grandmother. His father was an agricultural engineer. Jokić developed a love of basketball early in his life playing with his two older brothers, who were a decade older. Strahinja, the oldest brother, played basketball in Europe and Nemanja, the second oldest, played college basketball at the University of Detroit Mercy. The brothers are friends with former NBA player Darko Miličić. Jokić also loved horse racing as a child and competed as an amateur, a passion he still holds today.

Professional career

Mega Basket (2012–2015)
Jokić played youth basketball in Vojvodina Srbijagas, where he became a dominant figure and received interest from bigger teams. In the summer of 2012, Jokić signed a contract with Mega Vizura, although in the first season with the team he played mostly for their junior team in 2012–13. At the age of 17, he appeared in 5 games of the Serbian League and averaged 1.8 points and 2 rebounds in 10.2 minutes per game. In the 2013–14 season, he saw more minutes on the court for the senior team. Over 25 Adriatic League games, he averaged 11.4 points, 6.4 rebounds and 2.5 assists per game. He also played 13 games with the team in the Serbian League and had similar production, averaging 10.9 points, 6 rebounds and 3.3 assists per game.

On June 26, 2014, Jokić was selected by the Denver Nuggets with the 41st overall pick in the 2014 NBA draft and following this and the departure of Ratko Varda, he became one of the team leaders in the 2014–15 season. In the first game of the Adriatic League, he led his team to a 103–98 win over MZT Skopje, by scoring 27 points and grabbing 15 rebounds for a total index rating of 44. He was named the MVP of Round 1. On November 3, he recorded 17 points, 12 rebounds and season-high 8 assists for a total index rating of 40, in a 90–84 victory over Zadar. For such performance, he was named the MVP of the Round 6. On February 7, he scored 27 points and grabbed 15 rebounds in a 77–88 loss to Szolnoki Olaj. He was named the MVP of the Round for the third time in a season. For his performances over the month, he was named the MVP for February, having averaged 21.7 points and 12.3 rebounds per game. On March 21, he scored a season-high 28 points and added 15 rebounds to help his team win with 100–96 over Igokea. He was named the MVP of the Round 26, his fourth Round MVP award over the season. Even though Mega Leks finished in 10th place in the Adriatic League, Jokić became one of the league's most valuable players. Over 24 games played, he averaged 15.4 points, league-leading 9.3 rebounds and 3.5 assists per game, while leading the league with the index rating of 22. On March 26, he was officially named the Adriatic League regular season MVP. He was also named the ABA League Top Prospect for the 2014–15 season.

After the elimination by Partizan Belgrade in the semifinals of the Serbian League, Jokić parted ways with the team to pursue an NBA career. In 14 games of the Serbian League, he averaged 18.4 points, 10.4 rebounds and 2.7 assists per game, while shooting 56.6% from the field.

Denver Nuggets (2015–present)

2015–16 season: All-Rookie honors
In the summer of 2015, Jokić joined the Denver Nuggets, one season after being drafted. On July 28, 2015, he signed a contract with the Nuggets after averaging 8.0 points and 6.2 rebounds in five summer league games for the team. On November 18, 2015, he had a then season-best game with 23 points and 12 rebounds in a 109–98 loss to the San Antonio Spurs. On January 10, 2016, he recorded a career-high nine assists in a 95–92 win over the Charlotte Hornets. On February 1, he recorded career highs of 27 points and 14 rebounds in a 112–93 win over the Toronto Raptors. On April 8, he set a new career high with 15 rebounds in a 102–98 win over the San Antonio Spurs. At the season's end, he finished third in the 2016 NBA Rookie of the Year Award voting and earned NBA All-Rookie First Team honors.

2016–17 season: Improving as a sophomore
On October 29, 2016, Jokić recorded 23 points and a career-high 17 rebounds in a 115–113 overtime loss to the Portland Trail Blazers. After starting the first eight games of the season, Jokić was moved to the bench on November 12. He remained coming off the bench for the next 14 games. During that stretch as a bench player, he had a season-high 27 points and 11 rebounds in a 112–92 loss to the Dallas Mavericks on December 12. On December 19, he recorded a near triple-double with 27 points, 15 rebounds and nine assists in a 117–107 win over Dallas. He had another near triple-double on December 28, recording 16 points, a career-high 11 assists and eight rebounds in a 105–103 win over the Minnesota Timberwolves. On January 16, 2017, he scored a career-high 30 points in a 125–112 win over the Orlando Magic. He surpassed that mark three days later, scoring 35 points in a 118–104 loss to the San Antonio Spurs. On February 3, 2017, he recorded his first career triple-double with 20 points, 13 rebounds and 11 assists in a 121–117 win over the Milwaukee Bucks. On February 10, 2017, he scored a career-high 40 points to lead the Nuggets to a 131–123 victory over the New York Knicks. He went 17 of 23 from the field and added nine rebounds and five assists. Three days later, he set career highs with 12 assists and 21 rebounds to go with 17 points in his second career triple-double in a 132–110 win over the Golden State Warriors.

On February 28, 2017, he recorded his third career triple-double with 19 points, 16 rebounds and 10 assists in a 125–107 win over the Chicago Bulls. The following night, he had his second straight triple-double and fourth of his career—all within 13 games. He finished with 13 points, 14 rebounds and 10 assists in a 110–98 win over the Milwaukee Bucks. On March 16, 2017, he recorded his fifth triple-double of the season with 17 points, 14 rebounds and 11 assists in a 129–114 win over the Los Angeles Clippers. On March 31, 2017, he recorded his sixth triple-double of the season with 26 points, 13 rebounds and 10 assists in a 122–114 loss to the Charlotte Hornets. Jokić finished the season with a 29-point, 16-rebound, eight-assist effort in a 111–105 season-finale win over the Oklahoma City Thunder on April 12. His six triple-doubles ranked fourth on the season behind Russell Westbrook (42), James Harden (22) and LeBron James (13). At the season's end, he finished second in the 2017 NBA Most Improved Player Award voting as well as in the 2017 Assist of the Year voting.

2017–18 season: Franchise player

On November 7, 2017, Jokić scored a career-high 41 points in a 112–104 win over the Brooklyn Nets. On November 13, he was named Western Conference Player of the Week for games played from Monday November 6 to Sunday November 12. He became the 17th Nugget in franchise history to earn Player of the Week honors and the first since Ty Lawson in March 2013. Jokić had a seven-game absence with a left ankle sprain in early December. On January 8, he had his first triple-double of the season with 22 points, 12 rebounds and 11 assists in a 124–114 loss to the Golden State Warriors. On February 15, in a 134–123 win over the Milwaukee Bucks, Jokić recorded 30 points, 15 rebounds and a career-high 17 assists, reaching a triple-double with 1:54 remaining in the second quarter. He recorded the quickest triple-double in NBA history in 14 minutes and 33 seconds, besting Jim Tucker's previous record of 17 minutes from 1955. On February 23, he recorded his third straight triple-double with 28 points, 11 rebounds and 11 assists in a 122–119 win over the San Antonio Spurs.

On March 7, he recorded 36 points and 13 rebounds in a 113–108 loss to the Cleveland Cavaliers. On March 15, he recorded his eighth triple-double of the season with 23 points, 12 rebounds and 10 assists in a 120–113 win over the Detroit Pistons, thus setting the most triple-doubles by a Nuggets player in a season since Fat Lever had nine in 1988–89. On April 1, he had 35 points and 13 rebounds in a 128–125 overtime win over the Bucks. On April 9, he was named Western Conference Player of the Week for games played from Monday April 2 to Sunday April 8, thus earning his second Player of the Week nod for the season. Later that day, he recorded 15 points, a season-best 20 rebounds and 11 assists in an 88–82 win over the Portland Trail Blazers, thus securing his 16th career triple-double and his 10th of the season. In the Nuggets' regular season finale on April 11, 2018, Jokić recorded 35 points and 10 rebounds in a 112–106 overtime loss to the Minnesota Timberwolves. It was his seventh 30-point game of the season. The loss ruled the Nuggets out of the playoffs with a 46–36 record. It was the first final-day play-in game in the NBA in 21 years, with Minnesota also vying for a spot in the playoffs.

2018–19 season: Breakout season, first All-Star and All-NBA appearances
On July 9, 2018, Jokić signed a five-year, $148 million maximum contract extension with the Nuggets. On October 20, 2018, in the Nuggets' second game of the season, Jokić recorded 35 points, 12 rebounds and 11 assists in a 119–91 win over the Phoenix Suns. He joined Wilt Chamberlain as the only players in NBA history to post a triple-double with 30 or more points without missing a field goal—Chamberlain did it twice, in 1966 and 1967. He also became just the second Nugget to record a triple-double in the first two games of the season, joining Fat Lever. Jokić went on to earn Western Conference Player of the Week honors for the first week of the season, becoming the sixth player in franchise history to win the award three or more times, joining Alex English, Dikembe Mutombo, Carmelo Anthony, Allen Iverson and Chauncey Billups. On November 3, he had a season-high 16 assists and 10 rebounds to go with seven points in a 103–88 win over the Utah Jazz. On November 9, he had a season-high 37 points and tied his career best with 21 rebounds in a 112–110 loss to the Brooklyn Nets. For his efforts in 2018, he was recognized as the Serbian Player of the Year by the Basketball Federation of Serbia.

On January 5, he scored a then season-high 39 points in a 123–110 win over the Charlotte Hornets. His second Player of the Week honor came for games played from December 31 to January 6. On January 8, he had his fourth triple-double of the season with 29 points, 11 rebounds and 10 assists in a 103–99 win over the Miami Heat. It was the 20th triple-double of his NBA career. At age 23, he became the third-youngest player to reach 20 triple-doubles; Oscar Robertson and Magic Johnson were both 22 at the time of their 20th. Two days later, he had 18 points, 14 rebounds and 10 assists in a 121–100 win over the Los Angeles Clippers. On January 13, he scored a season-high 40 points in 116–113 win over the Portland Trail Blazers. On January 19, he had his sixth triple-double of the season with 19 points, 12 assists and 11 rebounds in a 124–102 win over the Cleveland Cavaliers. It was his 22nd career triple-double, thus passing Kareem Abdul-Jabbar to move to second place on the NBA all-time triple-doubles list by a 7-footer. On January 23, he recorded 28 points and 21 rebounds in a 114–108 loss to the Jazz. On January 27, after serving a one-game suspension for leaving the bench during an on-court fracas against the Jazz, Jokić recorded his seventh triple-double with 32 points, 18 rebounds and 10 assists in a 126–110 win over the Philadelphia 76ers. On January 31, he received his first All-Star selection as a Western Conference reserve for the 2019 NBA All-Star Game, becoming the Nuggets' first All-Star since Anthony in 2011. On February 6, he recorded his 10th triple-double of the season with 25 points, 14 rebounds and 10 assists in a 135–130 loss to the Nets. On February 13, he recorded his 12th triple-double of the season with 20 points, 18 rebounds and 11 assists, while also tipping in the game winning shot with 0.3 seconds remaining to lift the Nuggets to a 120–118 win over the Sacramento Kings. His twelve triple-doubles ranked second on the season behind only Russell Westbrook (34). On March 14, Jokic hit a rainbow hook-shot at the buzzer against the Dallas Mavericks to award Denver a 100–99 win.

In Game 1 of the Nuggets' first-round playoff series against the San Antonio Spurs, Jokić became the fourth player in NBA history to record a triple-double in his playoff debut and the first since LeBron James in 2006. He had 10 points, 14 rebounds and 14 assists in a 101–96 loss. In Game 6 of the series, he scored 27 of his 43 points in the second half of the Nuggets' 120–103 loss. He also had 12 rebounds and nine assists. Those 43 points set a franchise record for most points in a playoff game. In Game 7, he helped the Nuggets win the series 4–3 with 21 points, 15 rebounds and 10 assists in a 90–86 victory. In Game 1 of the second round, Jokić scored 37 points in a 121–113 win over the Trail Blazers, becoming the first Nuggets player to score 35+ points in a conference semifinals game since Anthony (41 points) in May 2009. In Game 3 against Portland, he had 33 points, 18 rebounds and 14 assists in a 140–137 quadruple-overtime loss. In Game 4, he had 21 points, 12 rebounds and 11 assists in a 116–112 win. In Game 5, he recorded 25 points and 19 rebounds in a 124–98 win. His 19 rebounds tied a team NBA playoff high. The Nuggets were eliminated from the playoffs following a 100–96 loss to Portland in Game 7, despite Jokić's 29 points, 13 rebounds and four blocks. In 14 playoff games, he averaged 25.1 points, 13.0 rebounds and 8.4 assists in 39.7 minutes per game, with shooting splits of 50.6%/39.3%/84.6% field goals/three-point shots/free throws. Following the season, he was named as a player on the All-NBA First Team, a personal first for Jokić.

2019–20 season: Western Conference Finals and NBA Bubble comebacks
On November 8, 2019, Jokić made a game-winning jumper against the Philadelphia 76ers with 1.2 seconds remaining, to give the Nuggets a 98–97 victory, rallying from a 21-point deficit. In the very next game, he hit yet another game-winning jumper, just two days later, in a 100–98 overtime win over the Minnesota Timberwolves. On January 6, 2020, Jokić scored a career-high 47 points against the Atlanta Hawks in a 123–115 away win. On February 4, he recorded 30 points, 21 rebounds, and 10 assists in a 98–95 win over the Utah Jazz; it was the first 30/20/10 game by any NBA player in four years, and only the third since Abdul-Jabbar in 1976. On January 30, Jokić was selected to his second consecutive All-Star nod, becoming the first Nugget since Anthony in 2011 to have back-to-back honors.

In the first round playoff series against the Utah Jazz, Jokić closed the series with a hook shot to break the 78–78 score into 80–78 with 27 seconds remaining in the game, winning it for the Nuggets. He finished with 30 points, 14 rebounds and 4 assists. On September 13, Jokić recorded 34 points, 14 rebounds and seven assists to lead Denver to a 111–98 Game 6 victory, overcoming a 19-point 2nd-half deficit. On September 15, Jokić recorded a triple-double with 16 points, 22 rebounds and 13 assists to lead Denver to a 104–89 Game 7 victory over the heavily favored Los Angeles Clippers. Jokić joined Tim Duncan and Kevin Garnett as the only players in league history to post a 20-rebound triple-double in the postseason. With the win, the Nuggets became the first team in NBA history to come back from multiple 3–1 deficits in a single postseason. However, the Nuggets would go on to lose the Western Conference Finals in five games to the eventual NBA champion Los Angeles Lakers, with Jokić recording 22 points, 10 rebounds and five assists in the lone Denver victory in Game 3.

2020–21 season: First MVP award
Jokić started off the season with 4 triple-doubles in his first 6 games, in one of which he recorded a career-high 18 assists, on December 29, 2020, against the Houston Rockets in a 124–111 win. Doing so, Jokić became the first center to record at least 18 assists in a game since Chamberlain in 1968. On December 30, Jokić passed Fat Lever for most triple-doubles in Nuggets' franchise history in a 125–115 loss to the Sacramento Kings, which also saw him move up to 9th all-time in career triple-doubles. Jokić would continue his stellar play throughout the month of January, being awarded with back to back Western Conference Player of the Week awards, as well as being named the Western Conference Player of the Month, thus becoming the first Nuggets player to do so since Anthony.

On February 6, Jokić scored a career-high 50 points, grabbed 8 rebounds, dished out 12 assists along with three blocks in a 119–114 loss to the Sacramento Kings. He set a franchise record for being the first Nuggets player with at least 50 points and 10 assists while also becoming the first center to do so since Abdul-Jabbar in 1975. He also joined Anthony and Allen Iverson as the only Nuggets players with more than 50 points scored in the past 20 seasons. In addition, Jokić opened the season with 20 consecutive double-double games, putting him only behind Bill Walton (34 in 1976–77) since the American Basketball Association merged with the NBA in 1976. Later that same month, Jokić was selected for his third consecutive All-Star appearance, this time as a starter, becoming the first Nuggets player to start in the All-Star game since Anthony in 2011, as well as joining Alex English and David Thompson as the only Nuggets players to be selected to three straight NBA All-Star games. On March 2, Jokić recorded his 50th career triple-double, with a stat-line of 37 points, 10 rebounds and 11 assists, in a 128–97 blow-out win on the road against the Milwaukee Bucks. He became only the ninth player in NBA history to record 50 career triple-doubles, as well as only the second center to do so since Chamberlain. Jokić also became the third fastest player to reach 50 career triple-doubles, with only Oscar Robertson and Magic Johnson doing it faster than him.

On March 17, in a 129–104 win over the Charlotte Hornets, Jokić surpassed Dikembe Mutombo for most double-doubles in Nuggets' franchise history. He would go on to be named Western Conference Player of the Month, for the second time, for games played in March. Doing so, he became the only Nuggets' player in franchise history to win the award twice in a single season. On April 4, Jokić had 16 assists in a 119–109 win over the Orlando Magic. As a result, he marked his 81st career 10-assist game, passing Chamberlain for the most double-digit assist games by a center in NBA history.

Despite an injury-laden regular season, Jokić led the Nuggets to a third seed in the Western Conference, boasting a record of 47–25. While playing and starting in every single game, he led the league in all the major advanced metrics intended to measure a player's value, such as player efficiency rating (PER), win shares, offensive win shares, box plus-minus, and value over replacement player (VORP). Jokić also finished as the league leader in double-doubles, racking up 60 double-doubles on the year, while finishing second to Russell Westbrook for most triple-doubles on the season, with 16 triple-doubles of his own. He joined Oscar Robertson and Russell Westbrook as the only players in NBA history to average 26+ points, 10+ rebounds and 8+ assists for an entire season, and officially became the first-ever player to do so on better than 52 percent shooting (making 56.6 percent of his field goal attempts). In addition, Jokić became just the third player in NBA history to finish a season ranked in the top five in total points (3rd), rebounds (5th), and assists (3rd), joining Elgin Baylor and Chamberlain (3x).

In the first round of the playoffs, the Nuggets faced the Portland Trail Blazers. They would be without two of their best players, Jamal Murray and Will Barton, who were both out injured. Nonetheless, Jokić continued his elite level of play throughout the series, averaging 33 points (on 50/40/90 shooting splits), 10.5 rebounds and 4.5 assists. In Game 6, Jokić scored 27 of his 36 points in the second half to lead the Nuggets to a 126–115 series-clinching win. Denver would match up against the Phoenix Suns in the Western Conference Semifinals. In a Game 3 loss, Jokić tallied 32 points, 20 rebounds and 10 assists, joining Abdul-Jabbar and Chamberlain as the only players in NBA playoff history to post a 30/20/10 game. The Nuggets were eliminated from the playoffs in Game 4, with Jokić being ejected late in the third quarter after being assessed a flagrant foul two for making a hard swipe at the ball and catching the Suns' Cameron Payne in the face. For the playoffs, he averaged 29.8 points, 11.6 rebounds, and 5.0 assists per game.

For his regular season performance, Jokić won the NBA Most Valuable Player Award; in doing so, he became the first center to win the award since Shaquille O'Neal in 2000 as well as the first player in Denver Nuggets franchise history. He also became the first Serbian player, third European player overall, and sixth international player to ever win the award. Having been selected 41st overall in the 2014 NBA draft, Jokić became the lowest-drafted player in NBA history to be named MVP, as well as the first-ever player to be drafted in the second round of the common draft era (since 1966) to win the award. In addition, Jokić and Vasilije Micić became the first-ever pair of players from the same country to be awarded both NBA MVP and EuroLeague MVP honors in the same season.

2021–22 season: Second MVP award

On November 8, 2021, in a 113–96 blowout win over the Miami Heat, Jokić and opposing forward Markieff Morris were both ejected after Morris shoved Jokić, leading Jokić to shoulder Morris in the back. The next day, the NBA announced that they had suspended Jokić for one game without pay. On December 6, Jokić recorded his 60th triple-double, in a 109–97 loss to the Chicago Bulls, overtaking Larry Bird for 8th on the all-time career triple-double list. On December 9, Jokić scored 11 of his then season-high 39 points in overtime, to go with his 11 assists and 11 rebounds on 17-of-23 shooting from the field, as the Nuggets beat the New Orleans Pelicans. On December 27, Jokić tied his career best with 22 rebounds and added 26 points, eight assists, two steals, and two blocks in a 103–100 win against the Los Angeles Clippers, and became the first player to record 25-plus points, 20-plus rebounds, and 5-plus assists in consecutive games since Charles Barkley in 1988. 

On January 5, 2022, Jokić logged his 64th career triple-double with 26 points, 21 rebounds, 11 assists, and two blocks in a 115–109 loss to the Utah Jazz, and became the only player since 1980 to record multiple 25-points, 20-rebounds, and 11-assists games. On January 19, Jokić recorded his 67th career triple-double with a season-high 49 points, 14 rebounds, 10 assists, and three steals in a 130–128 overtime win over the Clippers. On January 25, Jokić scored 28 points, grabbed 21 rebounds, and delivered nine assists in a 110–105 win over the Detroit Pistons; he also became the only player in NBA history to record 5,000 rebounds and 3,000 assists within his first 500 career games. On January 27, Jokić was selected for his fourth consecutive NBA All-Star appearance, second in a row as a starter, joining Alex English as the only Nuggets players to be selected to four straight NBA All-Star games. On January 31, Jokić amassed his 70th career triple-double recording 18 points, 10 rebounds, and 15 assists in three quarters of action in a 136–100 blow-out win over the reigning champions Milwaukee Bucks. For his play in January, Jokić was named Western Conference Player of the Month for the third time in his career, tying Carmelo Anthony and English for most Player of the Month honors in Nuggets franchise history. Jokić recorded seven triple-doubles and became one of just five players in NBA history to have seven-or-more in a single month, joining Russell Westbrook, Oscar Robertson, Wilt Chamberlain, and Michael Jordan as the only players to achieve this feat.
 
On February 6, in his 500th NBA game, Jokić logged his 71st career triple-double with 27 points, 12 rebounds, 10 assists, and two steals on 12-of-15 shooting from the field in a 124–104 win against the Brooklyn Nets; in league history, only Robertson (151) and Magic Johnson (73) recorded more triple-doubles through their first 500 games. On February 11, he became the fifth player in NBA history to have multiple seasons recording 15 or more triple-doubles. The next day, Jokić scored 28 points along with 15 rebounds, six assists, and two blocks in a 110–109 win against the Toronto Raptors. His pivotal late block ended the Raptors' winning streak at eight. On February 16, Jokić had 35 points, 17 rebounds and eight assists in a 117–116 win over the Golden State Warriors. His final assist for the night was to Monte Morris, who hit the game-winning shot. 

On March 6, in a 138–130 overtime win over the Pelicans, Jokić recorded a triple-double with 46 points, 12 rebounds, 11 assists, 3 steals, and 4 blocks. He scored 30 of his 46 points in the fourth quarter and overtime, and joined Chamberlain as the only players to record a 45 point triple-double whilst shooting 70 percent from the field in the same game. On March 7, Jokić logged his 75th career triple-double with 32 points, 15 rebounds, and 13 assists in a 131–124 win over the Warriors. On March 10, Jokić led Denver to their 10th win in 11 games with 38 points, 18 rebounds, seven assists, and two blocks against the Sacramento Kings. On March 16, in a 127–109 win over the Washington Wizards, Jokić became the second-fastest player to record 10,000 points, 5,000 rebounds, and 3,000 assists. He achieved this feat in his 516th NBA appearance, 1 game short of Larry Bird's record (515). On March 26, Jokić scored 35 points, to go with 12 rebounds, eight assists, two steals and two blocks on 13-of-15 shooting from the field in a 113–107 win over the Oklahoma City Thunder. He became the 2nd player in NBA history after Wilt Chamberlain with 3 or more career 35/10/5 games on 85% shooting. 

On April 7, Jokić recorded 35 points, 16 rebounds, six assists, and four steals in a 122–109 win over the Memphis Grizzlies to clinch a playoff spot outside of the NBA Play-In Tournament. He became the first player in NBA history to tally at least 2,000 points, 1,000 rebounds, and 500 assists in a season. Jokić's late-season surge also saw him become the first player since Chamberlain to register at least 35 points and 12 rebounds in five straight games. For games played in March and April, Jokić was named Western Conference Player of the Month, for the second time in the season, and fourth time in his career, surpassing Carmelo Anthony and Alex English for most such honors in Nuggets franchise history. Jokić finished the regular season averaging 27.1 points, 13.8 rebounds, and 7.9 assists on 58.3%/33.7%/81.0% shooting splits, and led the Nuggets to a 48–34 winning record for the last direct playoff spot (No. 6) despite Denver's second and third best players missing nearly the entire season. He became the first player in NBA history to average over 25 points, 13 rebounds and 7 assists in a season and the first to lead his team in points, rebounds, assists, steals, blocks and field goal percentage. He was the only player in the NBA this season to finish in the top 10 in points per game, rebounds per game and assists per game. His advanced metrics were historically great, garnering the highest single-season player efficiency rating in NBA history at 32.85. He also led the NBA in win shares, offensive win shares, box plus-minus, value over replacement player, total rebounds, double-doubles (66), and triple-doubles (19).

On April 21, in Game 3 of the first round of the playoffs, Jokić logged 37 points, 18 rebounds, 5 assists and 3 steals in a 118–113 loss against the Warriors. Three days later, he scored 37 points along with 8 rebounds and 6 assists in a 126–121 Game 4 win. Denver would go on to lose to Golden State in five games despite Jokić’s 30-point, 19-rebound, 8-assist and 2-block outing in the 102–98 close-out loss in Game 5. He scored 12 of his 30 points in the final 4 minutes of the game. After the game, former Defensive Player of the Year and perennial All-Defensive Team member Draymond Green found Jokić for a word: "I told him thank you for making me better. It's an honor and a pleasure to play someone so skilled. Usually when you have guys that talented and skilled, they're soft. And he's far, far from soft. He's an absolutely incredible player." For the playoffs, Jokić averaged 31.0 points, 13.2 rebounds, 5.8 assists, 1.6 steals and 1 block per game on 57.5% shooting from the field.

On May 12, Jokić was named the NBA Most Valuable Player Award for the second year in a row, beating finalists Joel Embiid and Giannis Antetokounmpo. He became the 13th player to win the award in consecutive seasons, as well as the second European player to win the award more than once, joining Antetokounmpo. On May 24, Jokić was selected to his third All-NBA First Team. He became the first player in club history to earn All-NBA team honors in four straight seasons and to have three career first-team selections, passing Hall of Fame guard David Thompson for the most in franchise history.

2022–23 season: Contract extension
On July 1, 2022, Jokić agreed to a five-year $264 million supermax contract extension with the Nuggets, making it the richest deal in NBA history. On October 21, in the second game of the regular season Jokić posted his 77th career triple-double with 26 points, 12 rebounds and 10 assists in a 128–123 win over the reigning champions Golden State Warriors. In the very next game, Jokić had another triple-double with 19 points, 16 rebounds, and 13 assists in a 122–117 win against the Oklahoma City Thunder; equaling Wilt Chamberlain for sixth all-time and most by a center with 78. On November 3, Jokić put up 15 points, 13 rebounds, and 14 assists in a 122–110 win over the Oklahoma City Thunder; surpassing Wilt Chamberlain for the most triple-doubles all time by a center with 79. On November 23, Jokić posted 39 points, 10 rebounds and nine assists, as the Nuggets beat the Oklahoma City Thunder in a 131–126 overtime win. On December 10, Jokić recorded his 80th career triple-double with 31 points, 12 rebounds, 14 assists and four blocks in a 115–110 win over the Utah Jazz. He became only the second player in NBA history to put up at least 31/12/14/4 in a game after LeBron James. On December 14, Jokić scored a season-high 43 points on 17-of-20 shooting from the field, along with 14 rebounds, eight assists, and five steals in a 141–128 win over the Washington Wizards. On December 18, Jokić put up a triple-double with 40 points, a career-high 27 rebounds, and 10 assists in a 119–115 win over the Charlotte Hornets. He also became the first NBA player since Wilt Chamberlain in 1968 to put up at least 35 points, 25 rebounds, and 10 assists in a game. On December 25, Jokić dropped 41 points, 15 rebounds and 15 assists in a 128–125 overtime win over the Phoenix Suns. He became only the third player in NBA history to record a 40-point, 15-rebound and 15-assist game, joining Oscar Robertson and James Harden. 

On January 1, 2023, Jokić recorded his 85th career triple-double with 30 points, 12 rebounds, 12 assists and zero turnovers on 10-of-13 shooting, 2-of-2 from three, 8-of-8 from the free throw line in a 123–111 win over the Boston Celtics. He became the first player in NBA history to have multiple games of at least 30 points, 10 assists, and 10 rebounds without a turnover. On January 6, Jokić recorded a triple-double with 28 points, 15 rebounds, and 10 assists in a 121–108 win over the Cleveland Cavaliers. He also joined Russell Westbrook, Magic Johnson, and Oscar Robertson as the only players in NBA history to record at least 10 triple-doubles in six different seasons. On January 9, Jokić put up a triple-double with 14 points, 11 rebounds, and 16 assists on 5-of-5 shooting from the field and 3-of-3 shooting from the free throw line in a 122–109 win over the Los Angeles Lakers. He became the first player in NBA history to put up at least 10 points, 10 rebounds, and 15 assists on 100% shooting from the field in a game. On January 15, Jokić made a game-winning three-pointer in a 119–116 win over the Orlando Magic. On January 17, Jokić posted a triple double with 36 points, 12 rebounds and 10 assists on 13-of-14 shooting from the field in a 122–113 win over the Portland Trail Blazers. He became the first player in NBA history to put up two 35-point triple-doubles while shooting 90% from the field. The next day, Jokić recorded his 90th career triple-double and second in a row with 31 points, 11 rebounds and 13 assists in a 122–118 win over the Minnesota Timberwolves, and he surpassed Alex English (3,679) to become the Nuggets' all-time assists leader. He also became the first center in NBA history to lead a franchise in career assists. On January 26, Jokić was named a Western Conference starter for the 2023 NBA All-Star Game, marking his fifth consecutive selection and third in a row as a starter. On January 31, Jokić had his 92nd career triple-double with 26 points, 18 rebounds and 15 assists in a 122–113 win over the New Orleans Hornets. For his play in January, Jokić was named Western Conference Player of the Month for the fifth time in his career, making him the leader for most Player of the Month honors in Nuggets franchise history. With eight triple-doubles in January, he joined Wilt Chamberlain as the only centers in NBA history to record eight or more triple doubles in a single month. Jokić also became the first player to have shooting splits of 65% from the field, 50% from three and 85% from the free throw line in a month.

On February 2, Jokić recorded his 93rd career triple-double with 22 points, 14 rebounds and 16 assists in a 134–117 win over the reigning champions Golden State Warriors. He became one of just seven players in NBA history to post back-to-back games of 20 points or more, 10-plus rebounds and 15-plus assists, joining the likes of Oscar Robertson, Magic Johnson, Russell Westbrook, LeBron James, James Harden and Luka Dončić. On February 15, Jokić and the Nuggets won their 25th straight game when he has a triple-double. That is the most consecutive team wins when a player has a triple-double in NBA history, passing Magic Johnson and the Lakers from 1984–87. On February 23, first game after the All-Star Weekend, Jokić logged a triple-double with 24 points, 18 rebounds and 13 assists in a 115–109 victory over the Cleveland Cavaliers. On February 26, Jokić had 40 points, 17 rebounds, 10 assists and 3 steals in a 134–124 overtime win over the Los Angeles Clippers. The next game, he recorded his 100th career triple-double with 14 points, 11 rebounds and 10 assists in a 133–112 win over the Houston Rockets, becoming the sixth player in NBA history to have accomplished the feat. By winning the Western Conference Player of the Month for February, Jokić became the first player in Nuggets' franchise history to win the award in back-to-back months. 

On March 12, Jokić posted 35 points, 20 rebounds, 11 assists, 2 steals and 2 blocks in a 134–124 loss against the Brooklyn Nets. He became the first player since the NBA-ABA merger to put up multiple games of at least 35 points, 20 rebounds and 10 assists in a single season and third in NBA history after Elgin Baylor and Wilt Chamberlain.

National team career

Junior national team
Jokić was a member of the Serbian U-19 national basketball team that won the silver medal at the 2013 FIBA Under-19 World Championship. Over eight tournament games, he averaged 7.1 points, 5 rebounds and 1.5 assists per game.

Senior national team

He represented Serbia at the 2016 FIBA World Olympic Qualifying Tournament in Belgrade, where he earned tournament MVP honors while averaging 17.8 points, 7.5 rebounds and 2.8 assists per game.
At the 2016 Summer Olympics, Jokić and Serbia won the silver medal, after losing to the United States in the final game 96–66.

On May 24, 2019, Jokić announced he would play for Serbia at the 2019 FIBA Basketball World Cup. At the 2019 FIBA Basketball World Cup, the national team of Serbia was dubbed as favorite to win the trophy, but was eventually upset in the quarterfinals by Argentina. With wins over the United States and Czech Republic, it finished in fifth place. Jokić was the second-best player on the team behind Bogdan Bogdanović, averaging 11.5 points, 7.5 rebounds and 4.8 assists over eight games, while shooting 68.0% from the field.

On June 15, 2022, Jokić announced he would return to the national team, after 3 years, for the 2023 FIBA World Cup qualifiers and the EuroBasket 2022. He led Serbia to a perfect 5–0 record and first place in Group D at the EuroBasket 2022, but was eventually upset in the Round of 16 by Italy despite his 32-point, 13-rebound, 4-assist and 2-steal outing. Jokić was the best player on the team, averaging 21.7 points, 10.0 rebounds, 4.3 assists and 1.8 steals over six games, while shooting 66.2 percent from the field, 46.2 percent from three-point range, and 90.9 percent from the free throw line.

Player profile
Standing  and weighing , Jokić plays exclusively at the center position. Through the 2021–22 season, Jokić's career averages are 19.7 points, 10.4 rebounds, and 6.2 assists per game.

Jokić is considered by many to be the greatest passing big man in NBA history. As a playmaker, Jokić uses his size and vision to set up his teammates for scores, often through a variety of no looks and unique deliveries. His techniques, in particular his one-handed passes, have drawn comparisons to those of a water polo player. Playing at a slow and deliberate pace, Jokić often pauses upon receiving the ball to survey the floor for defensive mistakes and potential openings.

In addition to his playmaking ability, Jokić is also a versatile scorer, capable of effectively finishing in the paint as well as hitting jump shots from midrange and the three-point arc. During his first MVP season, Jokić shot .566 from the field and .388 from 3-point range. His signature move, the "Sombor Shuffle" (coined by Nuggets play-by-play announcer Chris Marlowe after Jokić's hometown of Sombor), involves jumping off his right foot before launching a high-arching fadeaway. Jokić developed the move during his recovery from an ankle injury in 2017. The unorthodox move is difficult to contest and has drawn comparisons to Dirk Nowitzki's one-legged fadeaway.

NBA career statistics

Regular season

|-
| style="text-align:left;"|
| style="text-align:left;"|Denver
| 80 || 55 || 21.7 || .512 || .333 || .811 || 7.0 || 2.4 || 1.0 || .6 || 10.0
|-
| style="text-align:left;"|
| style="text-align:left;"|Denver
| 73 || 59 || 27.9 || .577 || .324 || .825 || 9.8 || 4.9 || .8 || .8 || 16.7
|-
| style="text-align:left;"|
| style="text-align:left;"|Denver
| 75 || 73 || 32.6 || .500 || .396 || .850 || 10.7 || 6.1 || 1.2 || .8 || 18.5
|-
| style="text-align:left;"|
| style="text-align:left;"|Denver
| 80 || 80 || 31.3 || .511 || .307 || .821 || 10.8 || 7.3 || 1.4 || .7 || 20.1
|-
| style="text-align:left;"|
| style="text-align:left;"|Denver
| 73 || style="background:#cfecec;"|73* || 32.0 || .528 || .314 || .817 || 9.7 || 7.0 || 1.2 || .6 || 19.9
|-
| style="text-align:left;"|
| style="text-align:left;"|Denver
| style="background:#cfecec;"|72* || style="background:#cfecec;"| 72* || 34.6 || .566 || .388 || .868 || 10.8 || 8.3 || 1.3 || .7 || 26.4
|-
| style="text-align:left;"|
| style="text-align:left;"|Denver
| 74 || 74 || 33.5 || .583 || .337 || .810 || 13.8 || 7.9 || 1.5 || .9 || 27.1
|- class="sortbottom"
| style="text-align:center;" colspan="2"|Career
| 527 || 486 || 30.4 || .542 || .345 || .830 || 10.4 || 6.2 || 1.2 || .7 || 19.7
|- class="sortbottom"
| style="text-align:center;" colspan="2"|All-Star
| 5 || 3 || 17.2 || .667 || .429 ||  || 6.4 || 4.0 || .8 || .2 || 6.2

Playoffs

|-
| style="text-align:left;"|2019
| style="text-align:left;"|Denver
| 14 || 14 || 39.8 || .506 || .393 || .846 || 13.0 || 8.4 || 1.1 || .9 || 25.1
|-
| style="text-align:left;"|2020
| style="text-align:left;"|Denver
| 19 || 19 || 36.5 || .519 || .429 || .835 || 9.8 || 5.7 || 1.1 || .8 || 24.4
|-
| style="text-align:left;"|2021
| style="text-align:left;"|Denver
| 10 || 10 || 34.5 || .509 || .377 || .836 || 11.6 || 5.0 || .6 || .9 || 29.8
|-
| style="text-align:left;"|2022
| style="text-align:left;"|Denver
| 5 || 5 || 34.2 || .575 || .278 || .848 || 13.2 || 5.8 || 1.6 || 1.0 || 31.0
|- class="sortbottom"
| style="text-align:center;" colspan="2"|Career 
| 48 || 48 || 36.8 || .519 || .396 || .841 || 11.5 || 6.4 || 1.0 || .9 || 26.4

Records
Highest single-season player efficiency rating in NBA history (32.85).
Highest single-season player box plus-minus in NBA history (13.72).
Fastest triple-double in NBA history (14 minutes and 33 seconds).
Only NBA player to be selected in the second round of the common era draft to win the MVP award.
Only NBA player to reach at least 2,000 points, 1,000 rebounds, and 500 assists in a single season.
Only NBA player to average at least 25 points, 10 rebounds, and 8 assists per game on 52% field goal percentage in a single season.
Only NBA player to average at least 25 points, 13 rebounds, and 7 assists per game in a single season.
Only NBA player to lead his team in all five major statistics (points, rebounds, assists, steals, blocks) and field goal percentage in the same season.
Only NBA player to record a 15+ assist triple-double while shooting 100% from the field.
Only NBA player to record multiple 35+ point triple-doubles while shooting 90% from the field.
Only NBA player to record multiple 30+ point triple-doubles without a turnover.
Only NBA player since the NBA-ABA merger to post 35 points, 20 rebounds and 10 assists in multiple games in a single season.
Only NBA player since the NBA-ABA merger to post 30 points, 20 rebounds and 10 assists in multiple games: Denver Nuggets,  and 
Third NBA player since the NBA-ABA merger to post 30 points, 20 rebounds and 10 assists in a game: Denver Nuggets,  and 
Also achieved by David Lee (New York Knicks), DeMarcus Cousins (New Orleans Pelicans), and Giannis Antetokounmpo (Milwaukee Bucks)
Sixth NBA player to lead his team in all five major statistics (points, rebounds, assists, steals, blocks) in the same season: Denver Nuggets, 
Also achieved by Dave Cowens (Boston Celtics), Scottie Pippen (Chicago Bulls), Kevin Garnett (Minnesota Timberwolves), LeBron James (Cleveland Cavaliers), and Giannis Antetokounmpo (Milwaukee Bucks)

Personal life
During Jokić's early years in Denver, he lived in a shared apartment with his then girlfriend and his two older brothers, Nemanja (b. 1984) and Strahinja (b. 1982). Jokić married his longtime girlfriend Natalija Mačešić on October 24, 2020 in his hometown of Sombor. Together they have a daughter who was born in September 2021.

See also

 List of NBA drafted players from Serbia
 List of National Basketball Association career triple-double leaders
 List of European basketball players in the United States
 List of Serbian NBA players
 List of Olympic medalists in basketball
 List of foreign NBA players
 KK Joker
 NBA regular season records

Notes

References

External links

 Nikola Jokić at fiba.com

1995 births
Living people
2019 FIBA Basketball World Cup players
Basketball players at the 2016 Summer Olympics
Centers (basketball)
Denver Nuggets draft picks
Denver Nuggets players
KK Mega Basket players
Medalists at the 2016 Summer Olympics
National Basketball Association All-Stars
National Basketball Association players from Serbia
Olympic basketball players of Serbia
Olympic medalists in basketball
Olympic silver medalists for Serbia
Serbia men's national basketball team players
Serbian expatriate basketball people in the United States
Serbian men's basketball players
Sportspeople from Sombor